Wiesław Wernic (28 February 1906 in Warsaw, 1 August 1986), popular Polish writer and journalist, best known for his series of Wild West books, sometimes called "Polish Karl May".

During World War II he was a member of the Home Army and fought in the Warsaw Uprising, and after the war he worked for a Polish daily Rzeczpospolita and weekly "Tygodnik Demokratyczny".  His first stories were published in 1927, he returned to writing in the sixties when he wrote his first Wild West book "Tropy wiodą przez prerię".  Over the next 30 years he wrote 20 books about the adventures of Doctor John (Jan in Polish; his alter ego) and his friend Charles (Karol in Polish) Gordon.  Unlike Karl May to whom he was often compared, Wernic visited United States a number of times where he met with American Indians and was a leading authority on the history and customs of the Wild West.

Some of his books were translated into German, Slovak, Romanian and Czech languages.  He sold well over 2,000,000 books in Poland and over 350,000 in other languages.

Works
  1965 ( in German,  in Slovak,  in Czech)
  1966 ( in German,  in Slovak,  in Romanian)
  1967 ( in German,  in Czech)
 Colorado 1969 (Colorado in German)
  1970
  1970
  1972
  1972
  1973
  1974
  1975
  1976
 Barry Bede 1977
 Old Gray 1978
  1980
  1982
  1983
  1985
  1988
  1990

References

1906 births
1986 deaths
Home Army members
Polish male novelists
Polish Lutherans
Western (genre) writers
Male journalists
20th-century Polish novelists
20th-century Polish journalists
20th-century Lutherans
Warsaw Uprising insurgents